Notre-Dame-de-Gravenchon is a former commune in the Seine-Maritime department in the Normandy region in northern France. On 1 January 2016, it was merged into the new commune of Port-Jérôme-sur-Seine.

Geography

History
 The parishes of Saint-Georges-de-Gravenchon and Notre Dame were part of the royal domain of Lillebonne. The Counts of Évreux built the medieval castle of Fontaine-Saint-Denis. The two parishes were joined as one commune in 1823 under the name of Notre-Dame-de-Gravenchon.
 Napoleon III opened the new industrial area of Port-Jérôme. A commemorative stone recalls his visit on May 28, 1861. Until then, the commune was an agricultural town.
 In 1930, two oil refineries with two separate housing districts were established. "Standard" (for Esso employees) and "Vacuum" (for Mobil Oil's workers).
 During World War II, the refineries were partly destroyed (1940) but rebuilt after 1945. Notre Dame de Gravenchon was occupied by the Germans on 12 June 1940 and liberated on 31 August 1944 jointly by the British and Belgian armies (Brigade Piron).

Heraldry

Population

Economy
Notre-Dame-de-Gravenchon features a large industrial complex centered around the Seine river. The industrial area is dominated by Port-Jérôme-Gravenchon Refinery run by Esso.

Places of interest
 The church of Notre-Dame, dating from the twelfth century.
 The church of St. Georges, dating from the twentieth century.
 A seventeenth century public washhouse.
 Vestiges of the medieval castle and chapel at La Fontaine-Saint-Denis.

Twinning
Notre Dame de Gravenchon is twinned with Street, a village in Somerset, a county in the south west of England and Isny im Allgäu a city in the South of Baden-Würrtemberg, Germany and also Rubano in Northern Italy.

See also
Communes of the Seine-Maritime department

References

External links

 Official website of the commune 

Former communes of Seine-Maritime